Carrog railway station in Denbighshire, Wales, was formerly a station on the Ruabon to Barmouth line. A camping coach was positioned here by the Western Region from 1956 to 1962. It was to have closed to passengers on Monday 18 January 1965 but closed prematurely on 14 December 1964 due to flood damage. It was reopened in 1996 as part of the preserved Llangollen Railway. It is a passing place on the single line and has a signal box.

According to the Official Handbook of Stations the following classes of traffic were being handled at this station in 1956: G, P, F, L, H, C but there was no crane.

Services

References

Sources

Further reading

External links
  Friends of Carrog station website
 Carrog station on navigable 1952 O. S. map

Beeching closures in Wales
Heritage railway stations in Denbighshire
Railway stations in Great Britain opened in 1865
Railway stations in Great Britain closed in 1964
Former Great Western Railway stations
Llangollen Railway
Corwen